The Valley Trail is a  long hiking trail in Grand Teton National Park in the U.S. state of Wyoming. Though the trail can be accessed at numerous trailheads in Grand Teton National Park, the southern terminus is near Teton Village, Wyoming, just outside the park. Heading north from Teton Village, the Valley Trail flanks the base of the Teton Range and skirts the shores of Phelps, Taggart, Bradley, Jenny, String, Leigh, Bearpaw and Trapper Lakes. Along its  length, it is sometimes known by other names such as the Jenny Lake Trail or the String Lake Trail.

See also
List of hiking trails in Grand Teton National Park

References

Hiking trails of Grand Teton National Park